Romain Hamouma (born 29 March 1987) is a French professional footballer who plays as a winger for Ligue 1 club Ajaccio.

Career 
On 20 June 2022, after having played for Saint-Étienne for ten years, Hamouma joined newly-promoted Ligue 1 side Ajaccio.

Personal life
Hamouma's paternal grandfather was from the Kabylie region of Algeria, and he has been approached to compete for the Algeria national team, but he has declined, saying that he "feels more French than Algerian".

Career statistics

Honours
Saint-Étienne
Coupe de la Ligue: 2012–13
 Coupe de France runner-up: 2019–20

References

External links
 
 Romain Hamouma career statistics at Topforward

1987 births
Living people
People from Lure, Haute-Saône
Sportspeople from Haute-Saône
Association football forwards
French footballers
French sportspeople of Algerian descent
Ligue 1 players
Ligue 2 players
Championnat National 2 players
Racing Besançon players
ASM Belfort players
Stade Lavallois players
Stade Malherbe Caen players
AS Saint-Étienne players
AC Ajaccio players
Footballers from Bourgogne-Franche-Comté